Eloy Vargas (born December 30, 1988) is a Dominican professional basketball player for Club Atlético Aguada of the Liga Uruguaya de Básquetbol (LUB). He started his collegiate basketball career at Florida, and finished it at Kentucky, and represents the Dominican national team in international competition.

Professional career
After graduating from the University of Kentucky in 2012, Vargas returned to the Dominican Republic to play for Cañeros de La Romana of the Liga Nacional de Baloncesto.

On August 24, 2012, Vargas signed a two-year deal with CB Clavijo of the LEB Oro. He later left Clavijo in September 2012 before appearing in a game for them. He then signed with Alba Fehérvár of Hungary in October 2012 but did not end up joining the team. He went on to play for three Dominican teams in 2013: Cupes de los Pepines, San Lazaro and Cañeros de La Romana.

In July 2013, Vargas joined the New York Knicks for the 2013 NBA Summer League. On November 27, 2013, he signed with Baloncesto Fuenlabrada of Spain for the rest of the 2013–14 season. In June 2014, he joined Metros de Santiago of the Liga Nacional de Baloncesto.

On November 1, 2014, Vargas was selected by the Los Angeles D-Fenders with the 17th overall pick in the 2014 NBA Development League Draft. In April 2015, he signed with Vaqueros de Bayamón of the Puerto Rican Baloncesto Superior Nacional. In June 2015, he re-signed with Metros de Santiago for the 2015 LNB season.

On September 28, 2015, he signed with Kavala of the Greek Basket League. In November 2015, he parted ways with Kavala after appearing in seven games. In early December 2015, he signed with Defensor Sporting of the Liga Uruguaya de Basketball.

On July 28, 2017, Vargas signed with French club Boulazac Dordogne for the 2017–18 season.

Vargas spent the 2019-20 season in Brazil with Flamengo Basketball. On September 26, 2020, he signed with Chemidor Qom of the Iranian league.

References

External links
Eurobasket.com profile

1988 births
Living people
2014 FIBA Basketball World Cup players
Baloncesto Fuenlabrada players
Basketball players at the 2019 Pan American Games
Centers (basketball)
Dominican Republic expatriate basketball people in France
Dominican Republic expatriate basketball people in Greece
Dominican Republic expatriate basketball people in Spain
Dominican Republic men's basketball players
Florida Gators men's basketball players
Gimnasia y Esgrima de Comodoro Rivadavia basketball players
Kavala B.C. players
Kentucky Wildcats men's basketball players
Liga ACB players
Los Angeles D-Fenders players
Miami Dade Sharks men's basketball players
People from Espaillat Province
2019 FIBA Basketball World Cup players
Pan American Games competitors for the Dominican Republic
Dominican Republic expatriate basketball people in the United States
Dominican Republic expatriate basketball people in Argentina
Dominican Republic expatriate basketball people in Brazil
Dominican Republic expatriate basketball people in Iran
Dominican Republic expatriate basketball people in Puerto Rico